Crossbar Latch is a technology devised by Phillip Kuekes of HP Labs in 2001 (with a US patent being granted in 2003), that Hewlett-Packard believes might replace transistors in various applications. This would enable the creation of integrated circuits composed solely of memristors, which, according to the patent, might be easier and less expensive to create. HP Labs stated that memristors could someday replace transistors in the same way that transistors replaced vacuum tubes.

Details
The crossbar was introduced by HP Labs scientists in the Journal of Applied Physics, which provides a basis for constructing logic gates using memristors. The crossbar latch consists of a signal line crossed by two control lines.  Depending on the voltages sent down the various lines, it can simulate the action of the three major logic gates: AND, OR and NOT.

The abstract of the patent is as follows:

Applications in arithmetic processing

Greg Snider of Hewlett-Packard created this application, which uses crossbar latches to imitate the functionality of a half adder, which is the foundation of modern computing systems.  A crossbar tile is created in this application from a layer of horizontal row wires and a layer of vertical column wires, with memristor or similar materials sandwiched between the horizontal and vertical wire layers. Each crossbar tile intersection or junction can be configured to be in a high-resistance state with little or no current flowing between the horizontal and vertical wires, or in a low-resistance state with current flowing. Fig. 1 illustrates the configuration of a half-adder using a crossbar tile, as taught by Snider, with the nodes identifying junctions of the crossbar tile configured as low-resistance states. By setting different logic inputs A, NOT A, B, and NOT B to different row wires this configuration produces the sum and carry outputs typical for a half-adder. Connections between multiple half-adders may then be used to form full adders in accordance with conventional arithmetic architectures.

Applications of crossbar latch in neuromorphics

Crossbar latches have been suggested as components of neuromorphic computing systems. One implementation of this is in the form of a neural network formed from nanowires as discussed in a patent by Greg Snider of Hewlett-Packard.

See also

Memristor

References

External links
 
 Research could send transistors the way of the vacuum tube (HP Press Release)
 HP claims molecular computing breakthrough (ComputerWorld)

Electrical components